Tz'utujil,  Tzutujil, Tzutuhil, Sutujil, and Zutuhil may refer to
 Tz'utujil people, an ethnic subgroup of the Maya
 Tz'utujil language, spoken by those people

Language and nationality disambiguation pages